Sam Fields (January 17, 1916 – July 16, 1954) was an American film editor.

Selected filmography
 Whistling Hills (1951)
 Texas Lawmen (1951)
 Stagecoach Driver (1951)
 Montana Incident (1952)
 Fargo (1952)
 Waco (1952)
 Dead Man's Trail (1952)
 The Gunman (1952)
 Texas City (1952)
 Jungle Gents (1954)
 The Desperado (1954)
The Human Jungle (1954)

References

Bibliography
 Blottner, Gene. Wild Bill Elliott: A Complete Filmography. McFarland, 2007.

External links

1916 births
1954 deaths
American film directors
American film editors